Inge Fuhrmann (born 11 May 1936) is a German sprinter. She competed in the women's 100 metres at the 1956 Summer Olympics.

References

External links
 

1936 births
Living people
Athletes (track and field) at the 1956 Summer Olympics
German female sprinters
Olympic athletes of the United Team of Germany
People from Kostrzyn nad Odrą
Sportspeople from Lubusz Voivodeship
Olympic female sprinters
Universiade medalists in athletics (track and field)
Universiade bronze medalists for West Germany